The China Village Electrification Program (Song Dian Dao Cun) was a scheme to provide renewable electricity to 3.5 million households in 10,000 villages by 2010. This was to be followed by full rural electrification using renewable energy by 2015. 

The total program was expected to cost in the region of US$5 billion, and solar generated electricity were expected to play a major role. China produces around 20% of the world’s total solar cells, and production is growing at over 50% each year. Small hydro and wind power were also likely to be employed. The Program followed on from the smaller China Township Electrification Program which ended in 2005. China was committed to generating 10% of its electricity from renewables by 2010.

External links
National Renewable Energy Laboratory publications
NREL: Efficient System Design and Sustainable Finance for China’s Village Electrification Program
Beijing Bergey Windpower Company: Wind Technology and Rural Electrification
ProjektConsult: Photoelectric Hybrid Plants for Village Electrification
Photovoltaics in Rural Electrification
China: Capacity Building for the Rapid Commercialisation of Renewable Energy
Alliance for Rural Electrification (non-profit trade organization)
Sustainable Energy Supply for Developing Countries
The Renewable Energy Law (text)
March 9, 2005, RenewableEnergyAccess.com: China Passes Renewable Energy Law

References

Renewable energy in China
Rural electrification
Electric power in China